Health Economics is a monthly peer-reviewed academic journal published by John Wiley & Sons, covering the subject of health economics. It was established in 1992.

According to the Journal Citation Reports, the journal has a 2020 impact factor of 3.046, ranking it 32nd out of 88 journals in the category "Health Policy & Services", 44th out of 108 journals in the category "Health Care Sciences & Services", and 95th out of 378 journals in the category "Economics",

See also 
 Journal of Health Economics
 List of scholarly journals in economics

References

External links
 

Health economics journals
Public health journals
Publications established in 1992
Wiley (publisher) academic journals
English-language journals
Monthly journals